
Cheilomenes is a genus of ladybirds (Coccinellidae). Like other members of their subfamily they are large typical ladybirds. They are always shiny and often have bright spots on the elytra. The common African species C. lunata is an important predator of the citrus aphid, Toxoptera, and wheat aphid, while C. vicina has been suggested as a biological control agent for the cowpea aphid. Both the larvae and adults are predatory. Freshly emerged larvae consume unhatched eggs, and eventually have a dappled appearance and 6 tubercles on each abdominal segment. Vulnerable stages in the life of C. sexmaculata, including oviposition, hatching, moulting and pupation have been shown to occur after dark, probably as an adaptation to avoid exposure to natural enemies.

Gallery

See also
List of Coccinellidae genera and species

References

External links
Cheilomenes, Biodiversity explorer
The Six-Spotted Zigzag Ladybird Beetle

Coccinellidae genera
Taxa named by Louis Alexandre Auguste Chevrolat